The 1988 All-Ireland Minor Hurling Championship was the 58th staging of the All-Ireland Minor Hurling Championship since its establishment by the Gaelic Athletic Association in 1928. The championship began on 14 May 1988 and ended on 4 September 1988.

Offaly entered the championship as the defending champions in search of a third successive All-Ireland title, however, they were beaten by Kilkenny in the Leinster final.

On 4 September 1988, Kilkenny won the championship following a 3-13 to 0-12 defeat of Cork in the All-Ireland final. This was their 13th All-Ireland title overall and their first title since 1981.

Cork's Brian Cunningham was the championship's top scorer with 3-29.

Results

Leinster Minor Hurling Championship

Quarter-finals

Semi-finals

Final

Munster Minor Hurling Championship

First round

Semi-finals

Final

Ulster Minor Hurling Championship

Semi-final

Final

All-Ireland Minor Hurling Championship

Semi-finals

Final

Championship statistics

Top scorers

Top scorers overall

Top scorers in a single game

References

External links
 All-Ireland Minor Hurling Championship: Roll Of Honour

Minor
All-Ireland Minor Hurling Championship